Carlos Guido (born 18 April 1966) is a Peruvian footballer. He played in eight matches for the Peru national football team from 1989 to 1991. He was also part of Peru's squad for the 1989 Copa América tournament.

References

External links
 

1966 births
Living people
Peruvian footballers
Peru international footballers
Association football defenders
Footballers from Lima